Nadine Roos (born 9 May 1996) is a South African rugby union and sevens player.

Biography 
Roos was abandoned by her mother at a pre-school crèche in South Africa, her grandmother traveled 160 miles in order to look after her. She was a hurdler and earned herself a bursary at the University of Pretoria where she was introduced to rugby.

Roos made her debut in the Dubai tournament of the 2016–17 World Rugby Women's Sevens Series.

In 2018, Roos competed for South Africa in the Commonwealth Games in Gold Coast, Queensland. She later featured in the Rugby World Cup Sevens in San Francisco where they finished 14th overall.

Roos made the South African team again and played in the 2022 Rugby World Cup Sevens in Cape Town. She was named in South Africa's women's fifteens team for the Rugby World Cup in New Zealand.

Roos made the 2021 CrossFit Games.

References

External links
Nadine Roos at CrossFit Games
Nadine Roos at 2018 Commonwealth Games

Living people
1996 births
South Africa international women's rugby sevens players
South African female rugby union players
CrossFit athletes
University of Pretoria alumni
Rugby sevens players at the 2018 Commonwealth Games